The 1999–2000 FIBA Korać Cup was the 29th edition of FIBA's Korać Cup basketball competition. The French Limoges CSP defeated the Spanish Unicaja in the final. This was Limoges' third time winning the title following victories in 1982 and 1983.

Teams 

</onlyinclude>
Notes

First Round 

|}

Second round

Sources:

Playoffs

Bracket

Third round 

|}

Top 16 

|}

Quarter finals 

|}

Semi finals 

|}

Finals 

|}

See also 

 1999-00 FIBA Euroleague
 1999-00 FIBA Saporta Cup

References

External links
 1999–2000 FIBA Korać Cup @ linguasport.com

1999–2000
1999–2000 in European basketball